No Humans Involved is the seventh novel in Kelley Armstrong's fantasy series Women of the Otherworld.  It is narrated by Jaime Vegas, a necromancer.

Plot
Jaime, who knows a thing or two about showbiz, is on a television shoot in Los Angeles when weird things start to happen. As a woman whose special talent is raising the dead, her threshold for weirdness is pretty high: she’s used to not only seeing dead people but hearing them speak to her in very emphatic terms. But for the first time in her life — as invisible hands brush her skin, unintelligible fragments of words are whispered into her ears, and beings move just at the corner of her eye — she knows what humans mean when they talk about being haunted.

She is determined to get to the bottom of these manifestations, but as she sets out to solve the mystery she has no idea how scary her investigation will get. As she digs into the dark underside of Los Angeles, she’ll need as much Otherworld help as she can get in order to survive, calling on her personal angel, Eve, and Hope, the well-meaning chaos demon. Jeremy, the alpha werewolf, is also by her side offering protection. And, Jaime hopes, maybe a little more than that.

External links
The novel's page at Armstrong's official website

2007 Canadian novels
Novels by Kelley Armstrong
Bantam Books books